Yuanming Jiangtang is a Buddhist temple located in the Jing'an District of Shanghai.

History
Yuanming Jiangtang was built by first Venerable Master of the Buddhist Association of China Yuan Ying in 1934, where he taught Pure Land Buddhism for almost ten years, and attracted large numbers of practitioners. The Yuanming Lengyan School and Shanghai Yuanming Buddhist College were established in 1945 and 1948 respectively. In 1958, the temple was used as a factory. During the ten-year Cultural Revolution the Red Guards had attacked the temple in 1966. The temple has been designated as a National Key Buddhist Temple in Han Chinese Area by the State Council of China in 1983. That same year, regular sutra lectures, meditation and other features of temple life were resumed.

A Buddhist seminary was re-established in 1997. In 2000, with the Longhua Temple monastery as co-sponsor, a new combined seminary was established under the name of "Hualin Buddhist Seminary" (华林佛学院).

Architecture
The existing main buildings include the Shanmen, Yuanming Lecture Room, Hall of Guanyin, Memorial Hall of Yuan Ying, and Buddhist Texts Library.

References

Buddhist temples in Shanghai
Buildings and structures in Shanghai
Tourist attractions in Shanghai
1934 establishments in China
20th-century Buddhist temples
Religious buildings and structures completed in 1934